Manonyane is a community council located in the Maseru District of Lesotho. Its population in 2006 was 22,491.

Villages
The community of Manonyane includes the villages of Fika-le-Motho, Ha Elia, Ha Filipi, Ha Ikaneng, Ha Khoarai, Ha Kholoko, Ha Koili, Ha Lebamang, Ha Lehloba, Ha Lisheane, Ha Maama, Ha Mabathoana, Ha Machai, Ha Maese, Ha Mafefooane, Ha Makafane, Ha Makoili, Ha Maribenyane, Ha Matiase, Ha Matsebetsebe, Ha Meshaka, Ha Mokela, Ha Mokhohla, Ha Mokhosi, Ha Mokoma, Ha Moling, Ha Monyooe, Ha Mopenyaki, Ha Morabaki, Ha Morema, Ha Motanyane, Ha Motebele, Ha Nthulenyane, Ha Ntsibane, Ha Paanya, Ha Pasane, Ha Patrick, Ha Ramokholutsoane, Ha Ramoropane, Ha Seqoma, Ha Shale, Ha Soibilane, Ha Teboho, Ha Tlapana, Ha Tlapole, Ha Tšehlo, Ha Tšeliso, Ha Tsiki, Ha Tsunyane, Hata-Butle, Khobeng, Khubetsoana, Likhorong, Liphakoeng, Liphehleng, Litenteng, Mafikeng, Mafikeng (Ha Motoko), Mahlanyeng, Makepeng, Malimong, Mangoapeng, Mangopeng, Maphotong, Matobo, Mikaeleng (Ha Pasane), Mohohlong, Moreneng, NUL Campus, Pae-lea-itlhatsoa, Thabana-Tšooana, Thoteng, Tloutle (Ha Shale), Tloutle (Sekhutlong), Tloutle (Thabana-Tšooana), Tloutle Sekhutlong and Voka.

References

External links
 Google map of community villages

Populated places in Maseru District